Chaicayán Group is a group of poorly defined sedimentary rock strata found in Taitao Peninsula in the west coast of Patagonia. The most common rock types are siltstone and sandstone. Conglomerate occur but is less common.

Study of fossils and uranium–lead dating of detrital zircons indicate a Miocene age, at least for the upper sequences. The Chaicayán Group deposited likely as a result of a marine transgression that drowned much of Patagonia and Central Chile in the Late Oligocene and Miocene.

The group is intruded by porphyritic stocks and sills of Pliocene age.

See also 
 Geology of Chile
 Ayacara Formation
 La Cascada Formation
 Puduhuapi Formation
 Vargas Formation

References 

Geologic groups of South America
Geologic formations of Chile
Miocene Series of South America
Neogene Chile
Sandstone formations
Siltstone formations
Geology of Aysén Region
Taitao Peninsula